Dubosq was a French sailor who competed in the 1900 Summer Olympics in Meulan, France. Dubosq also took, as crew, the bronze medal in the first race of the 1 to 2 ton and the 4th place in the second race of the 1 to 2 ton.

Further reading

References

External links

French male sailors (sport)
Sailors at the 1900 Summer Olympics – 1 to 2 ton
Olympic sailors of France
Olympic bronze medalists for France
Year of death missing
Year of birth missing
Olympic medalists in sailing
Sailors at the 1900 Summer Olympics – Open class
Place of birth missing
Place of death missing